Lah Ab (also Romanized as Lah Āb) is a village in Par Zeytun Rural District, Meymand District, Firuzabad County, Fars Province, Iran. At the 2006 census, its population was 42, in 10 families.

References 

Populated places in Firuzabad County